Magdalena León can refer to:
 Magdalena León de Leal (born 1939), Colombian feminist sociologist
 Magdalena León Trujillo (born 1959), Ecuadorian economist and researcher specializing in feminist economics